Sin Chang-mu (born 16 January 1963) is a South Korean equestrian. He competed in the individual dressage event at the 1988 Summer Olympics.

References

1963 births
Living people
South Korean male equestrians
South Korean dressage riders
Olympic equestrians of South Korea
Equestrians at the 1988 Summer Olympics
Place of birth missing (living people)
Asian Games medalists in equestrian
Equestrians at the 1986 Asian Games
Equestrians at the 1994 Asian Games
Equestrians at the 1998 Asian Games
Equestrians at the 2002 Asian Games
Asian Games gold medalists for South Korea
Asian Games silver medalists for South Korea
Asian Games bronze medalists for South Korea
Medalists at the 1986 Asian Games
Medalists at the 1994 Asian Games
Medalists at the 1998 Asian Games
Medalists at the 2002 Asian Games